The 1938 West Virginia Mountaineers football team was an American football team that represented West Virginia University as an independent during the 1938 college football season. In its second season under head coach Marshall Glenn, the team compiled a 4–5–1 record and was outscored by a total of 117 to 98. The team played its home games at Mountaineer Field in Morgantown, West Virginia. Alex Atty and Sam Audia were the team captains.

Schedule

References

West Virginia
West Virginia Mountaineers football seasons
West Virginia Mountaineers football